Gamochaeta ustulata, commonly named featherweed or Pacific cudweed,  is a North American species of flowering plant in the family Asteraceae. It is native to the western United States and southwestern Canada, in British Columbia, Washington, Oregon, and California. It is found primarily on seaside hills and in the Coast Ranges, with additional populations inland.

The plant forms many small flower heads in elongated arrays. Each head contains 4–6 yellow disc flowers but no ray flowers.

References

ustulata
Flora of the West Coast of the United States
Flora of British Columbia
Plants described in 1841
Flora without expected TNC conservation status